Teuila Fotu-Moala (born 29 November 1993) is a New Zealand rugby league footballer who played for the Brisbane Broncos and St George Illawarra Dragons in the NRL Women's Premiership. 

Primarily a er, she is a New Zealand representative and won a premiership with the Broncos in 2018.

Background
Born in Auckland, Fotu-Moala first played rugby league at McAuley High School.

Playing career
In 2013, Fotu-Moala joined Otahuhu Leopards, later becoming the captain-coach of the side.

On 9 November 2014, she made her Test debut for New Zealand in a 12–8 win over Australia, scoring the winning try in the 79th minute. On 3 February 2016, she was named the NZRL Women's Player of the Year for 2015.

Before the final, she won the Player of the Tournament award.

2018
In June, Fotu-Moala, along with Ali Brigginshaw, Brittany Breayley, Heather Ballinger and Caitlyn Moran, were named as the five marquee players for the Brisbane Broncos women's team. 

In Round 1 of the 2018 NRL Women's season, Fotu-Moala made her debut in the Broncos' 30–4 win over the St George Illawarra Dragons.

2019
In March, Fotu-Moala moved to Australia, joining the North Sydney Bears in the NSWRL Women's Premiership. In July, she signed with the St George Illawarra Dragons. 

In Round 1 of the 2019 NRL Women's season, Fotu-Moala was charged with a crusher tackle in a 4–14 loss to the Broncos. She became the first NRLW player to be charged by the match review committee and was suspended for three games, ruling her out for the rest of the season.

In October, she was a member of New Zealand's 2019 Rugby League World Cup 9s-winning squad.

2020

Achievements and accolades

Team
2018 NRLW Grand Final: Brisbane Broncos – Winners

References

External links
NRL profile

1993 births
Rugby league players from Auckland
Brisbane Broncos (NRLW) players
St. George Illawarra Dragons (NRLW) players
Living people
New Zealand female rugby league players
New Zealand sportspeople of Tongan descent
New Zealand women's national rugby league team players
Otahuhu Leopards players